The 2019–20 Scottish Lowland Football League was the seventh season of the Lowland Football League, the fifth tier of the Scottish football pyramid system. East Kilbride were the reigning champions.

Berwick Rangers became the second club to join the league via relegation from the SPFL, having lost the previous season's League Two play-off against Cove Rangers. East of Scotland League champions Bonnyrigg Rose Athletic were promoted to the league, replacing Whitehill Welfare who were relegated. Edusport Academy renamed to Caledonian Braves prior to the season.

The season began on 27 July 2019 and was scheduled to end on 18 April 2020, but on 13 March the league was indefinitely suspended due to the 2019–20 coronavirus outbreak. A points per game formula was subsequently used to determine the final standings, with Kelty Hearts declared champions on 13 April.

Teams

The following teams changed division after the 2018–19 season.

To Lowland League
Relegated from League Two
Berwick Rangers
Promoted from East of Scotland League
 Bonnyrigg Rose Athletic

From Lowland League
Relegated to East of Scotland League
 Whitehill Welfare
Folded
 Selkirk

Stadia and locations

Notes

All grounds are equipped with floodlights, except Victoria Park (Vale of Leithen).

Personnel and kits

Managerial changes

League summary

League table
With the season not being fully completed, a points per game formula was subsequently used to determine the final standings, with Kelty Hearts declared champions on 13 April. Only two teams' league positions were changed as a result; with BSC Glasgow's 2.32 points average moving them past the 2.04 of East Stirlingshire for third place.

Positions by round
The table lists the positions of teams after each round of matches. In order to preserve chronological progress, any postponed matches are not included in the round at which they were originally scheduled, but added to the full round they were played immediately afterwards. For example, if a match is scheduled for matchday 13, but then postponed and played between days 16 and 17, it will be added to the standings for day 16.

Source: Lowland League Table 
Updated: 29 February 2020

Results

Top scorers

League Cup
A 16-team straight knock-out tournament was scheduled to take place over four weekends at the end of the league season. Following the suspension of all Scottish football until the end of April due to the COVID-19 pandemic in Scotland, the League Cup was cancelled.

Lowland League play-off
A play-off match was scheduled to take place between the winners of the 2019–20 East of Scotland Football League and the 2019–20 South of Scotland Football League, subject to both clubs meeting the required licensing criteria for promotion. This was cancelled following the South of Scotland Football League declaring their season null and void. As a result, Bo'ness United were promoted subject to SFA approval.

References

External links

Lowland Football League seasons
5
Scottish
Scotland